The Museum of London Docklands (formerly known as Museum in Docklands), based in West India Quay, explains the history of the River Thames, the growth of Port of London and the docks' historical link to the Atlantic slave trade. The museum is part of the Museum of London and is jointly funded by the City of London Corporation and the Greater London Authority.

The museum opened in 2003 in grade I listed early-19th century Georgian "low" sugar warehouses built in 1802 on the north side of West India Docks, a short walk from Canary Wharf.

Collections and exhibits
Much of the museum's collection is from the museum and archives of the Port of London Authority, which became part of the port and river collections of the Museum of London in the 1970s. These were put into storage by the Museum of London in 1985. The museum includes videos presented by Tony Robinson, and it houses a large collection of historical artifacts, models, and pictures in 12 galleries and a children's gallery (Mudlarks), arranged over two floors. Visitors are directed through the displays in chronological order. The periods covered range from the first port on the Thames in Roman times to the closure of the central London docks in the 1970s and subsequent transformation of the area with commercial and residential developments.

The Museum of London Docklands has a lecture theatre and meeting rooms and hosts talks and events connected with the docks. Several workers who worked on the docks in the 1960s take part in these events, including one from the Pentonville Five. The reading room and Sainsbury's Study Centre house the archives.

The museum acquired several historic vessels for preservation over its existence. Among these were the tugboats Knocker White and Varlet, both acquired in 1986. By the 2010s the museum had decided to rationalise its collection of vessels, one was transferred to a local group, and another, the Wey barge Perseverance IV, to the National Trust. The last two vessels, Knocker White and Varlet, were transferred to Trinity Buoy Wharf in November 2016.

In 2007, the museum celebrated the bicentenary of the British abolition of slavery by opening a £14 million Heritage Lottery Funded exhibition entitled London, Sugar, Slavery about the practice. In March 2016, the museum opened an exhibit relating to the building itself. The building was originally called No.1 Warehouse, and was built in 1802 during the expansion of West India Docks. In September, the museum displayed Dick Moore's George Cross medal for bravery during the London Blitz. In 2017, the museum opened an exhibit displaying archaeological findings discovered during Crossrail work. In 2020 it plans to put the Havering hoard on display.

Gallery

Transport connections

See also
Museum of London
Museum of London Archaeology
Island History Trust
Culture of London
Robert Milligan

References

External links

Official website of the Museum of London Docklands
Official website of the Museum of London

Museum of London Docklands
Museum of London Docklands
Museum of London Docklands
Museum of London Docklands
Museum of London Docklands
Museums in the London Borough of Tower Hamlets
Maritime museums in England
Local museums in London
Museum of London Group
Port of London
Transport museums in London
Museums established in 2003
Museum of London Docklands
Commercial buildings in London
Canary Wharf buildings